is a 1962 Japanese film directed by Satoru Kobayashi and starring Tamaki Katori. It is generally recognized as the first movie in the pink film genre.

Flesh Market opened at the Ueno Okura Theater in Tokyo, which was operated by the film's production company OP Eiga, on February 27, 1962 Two days after the film opened, the Tokyo Metropolitan Police stopped the film's showing and confiscated all the prints and negatives. According to an interview with Kinya Ogawa, the film's Chief Assistant Director, the staff managed to put together a new version from rushes and extra footage, removing some of the more offensive scenes. The new film was immediately profitable probably because of the huge press coverage of the seizure event. A new term, eroduction, was invented to describe this emerging genre of film which later became known as pink film

Plot
Only a 21-minute fragment remains of the original film which ran 49 minutes. From written accounts of the film, it concerned a young girl (played by Tamaki Katori) who is captured by criminals while investigating the mysterious suicide of her sister in Tokyo.

Cast
 Tamaki Katori
 Hiroshi Asami
 Shirō Enami
 Kyōko Ōgimachi
 Tokiko Hisaki

References

External links
 

1962 films
Pink films
OP Eiga films
1960s pornographic films
1960s lost films
Films set in Tokyo
1960s Japanese films